Grace Episcopal Church is a historic Episcopal church located at Whitney Point in Broome County, New York.  It is a small wood-framed church constructed in 1871 in the High Victorian Gothic style.  It features a three-stage entrance tower surmounted by a spire and small wooden cross.

It was listed on the National Register of Historic Places in 1998.

A final service was held at the church on April 6, 2013.

References

Churches in Broome County, New York
National Register of Historic Places in Broome County, New York
Churches on the National Register of Historic Places in New York (state)
Episcopal church buildings in New York (state)
Churches completed in 1871
19th-century Episcopal church buildings